Mirador del Río is a viewpoint on an approximately  escarpment called Batería del Río in the north of the Canarian island of Lanzarote.

The location was created in between 1971 and 1973 by the local artist César Manrique in his typical style, consisting of a balustraded cafe, a souvenir shop and a platform on its top which are integrated in the lava rock. The technical realization of the work was carried out by Eduardo Cáceres and Jesús Soto and it was in 1973 when El Mirador del Río was inaugurated. Its surroundings have been declared a protected natural area. The building has the peculiarity that is barely visible from the outside thanks to a subtle and ingenious camouflage manoeuvre of hiding its structure under a heavy stone skin that blends in with the environment.

After accessing inside the building through a winding corridor, there are two spacious vaulted rooms with two large glass windows—the eyes of the Mirador—that allow contemplating an extraordinary panoramic view over the Strait of El Río (naming the viewpoint) towards the archaic island of La Graciosa. Also, on clear days, beyond the view of La Graciosa, the small islands of Montaña Clara and Roque del Oeste can be seen, with the furthest of them all being Alegranza. All of these are part of the Chinijo Archipelago.

From here guards watched for secretly landing ships in former times.

References

Tourist attractions in Lanzarote
Scenic viewpoints in Spain